Arunarsin bin Taib is a Malaysian politician who has served as Member of the Sabah State Legislative Assembly (MLA) for Gum-Gum since May 2018. He served as the State Assistant Minister of Youth and Sports of Sabah in the Heritage Party (WARISAN) administration under former Chief Minister Shafie Apdal and former Ministers Frankie Poon Ming Fung and Ginger Phoong Jin Zhe from May 2018 to the collapse of the WARISAN administration in September 2020. He is a member of WARISAN.

Election results

References

Malaysian politicians
Living people
Year of birth missing (living people)
People from Sandakan